Nibbiola (Piedmontese: Nibiola) is a comune (municipality) in the Province of Novara in the Italian region Piedmont, located about  northeast of Turin and about  southeast of Novara.

Nibbiola borders the following municipalities: Garbagna Novarese, Granozzo con Monticello, Novara, Terdobbiate, and Vespolate.

History
The area of Nibbiola was inhabited in ancient times, as attested by archaeological findings (necropolis). it is mentioned however only in 902 AD.

Main sights
The Castle, erected in 1198 by the commune's consuls, the Graciano of San Vittore. It was renovate in the 15th century. Built in brickwork, it has in the entrance side two corner towers and a central one, with a still-working draw-bridge. In the central court a Giardinone ("Big Garden") was added when the castle became a residence.
Church of San Vittore is modern, on the site of an edifice of the 11th century destroyed in the early 19th century.
Church of Santa Maria (16th century), located outside the town.

Demographic evolution

References

Cities and towns in Piedmont
Castles in Italy